Admiral Adams may refer to:

Benjamin H. Adams (1888–1989), U.S. Navy rear admiral
Charles Adam (1780–1853), British Royal Navy admiral
Clinton E. Adams (fl. 1980s–2020s), U.S. Navy rear admiral
John Adams (Royal Navy officer) (1918–2008), British Royal Navy rear admiral
Richard D. Adams (1909–1987), U.S. Navy rear admiral
Sandra E. Adams (born 1956), U.S. Navy rear admiral